Lennie Acuff (born January 24, 1965) is an American basketball coach, currently head coach of the Lipscomb Bisons men's basketball team.

Playing career
Acuff attended Shorter College where he set the single game, single season and career record for assists, which still stand to this day.

Coaching career
At 25, Acuff landed his first head coaching job with Belhaven College where he posted a 31–35 record over two seasons. He then moved on to Berry College where he'd compile a 65–64 overall record with back-to-back 20-win seasons in his final two seasons. Acuff would accept the head coaching position at Alabama–Huntsville, the town he grew up in. Over the course of 22 seasons at the helm of the Chargers, he would guide the team to eight Gulf South Conference regular season crowns, three conference tournament titles and 11 NCAA Division II tournament appearances, including the Elite Eight in 2011 and 2012.

On April 24, 2019 Acuff was named the 19th head men's basketball coach at Lipscomb, replacing Casey Alexander who departed for the same position at Belmont.

Head coaching record

NAIA

NCAA DII

NCAA DI

References

1965 births
Living people
Alabama–Huntsville Chargers men's basketball coaches
American men's basketball coaches
Basketball coaches from Alabama
Basketball players from Alabama
College men's basketball head coaches in the United States
Lipscomb Bisons men's basketball coaches
Shorter University alumni
Sportspeople from Huntsville, Alabama